Lyrian (born  September 21, 1985) is a Japanese moe idol and singer who hails from Milan, Italy.  She hosts a radio show in Japan called "Lyrian Moetchao" in which she plays Marissa Faireborn in its Transformers: Kiss Players segment.

Lyrian also named and designed the color schemes for the Transformers Rosanna and Angela. She voices these characters in the radio series as well.

She claims to have become a Transformer fan by watching the G1 cartoon as a child growing up in Italy.

In 2007 she released her first gravure idol DVD, titled Lyrian Chao Chao (also known as Lyrian Ciao Ciao). In the same year she released a photo-book titled Love.

In 2009 she provides the voice of the new character Stephanie in the TVTokyo series Yu-Gi-Oh! 5D's.

In 2010 she began voicing the character of Shitt. P in the Reborn! VOMIC series.

Sources
 Lyrian at the Japanese Idol Directory

External links
Lyrian no Moe-log
Unfix Entertainment
K-point Co., Ltd

Japanese voice actresses
1985 births
Living people
Japanese gravure models
Musicians from Milan